Raymond House may refer to:

United States 
(by state then town)
Wilbur S. Raymond House, Denver, Colorado, listed on the National Register of Historic Places (NRHP) in northeast Denver
Raymond-Bradford Homestead, Montville, Connecticut
Sloan-Raymond-Fitch House, Wilton, Connecticut, listed on the NRHP in Fairfield County
P.P. Raymond House, Malcom, Iowa, listed on the NRHP in Poweshiek County
J. E. Raymond House, Girard, Kansas, listed on the NRHP in Crawford County
Tilley Raymond House, Worcester, Massachusetts
Raymond House (Vassar College), town of Poughkeepsie, New York, on the campus of Vassar College
Liberty G. Raymond Tavern and Barn, Kenilworth, Ohio, listed on the NRHP in Trumbull County
Frank Mason Raymond House, New Franklin, Ohio, listed on the NRHP
Jessie M. Raymond House, Portland, Oregon, listed on the NRHP in southeast Portland
Charles and Joseph Raymond Houses, Middletown, Pennsylvania, listed on the NRHP in Dauphin County
Raymond-Morley House, Austin, Texas, listed on the NRHP in Travis County
Isaac M. Raymond Farm, Woodstock, Vermont, listed on the NRHP in Windsor County
Raymond-Ogden Mansion, Seattle, Washington, listed on the NRHP in King County